The Ezra Allred Bungalow in Paris, Idaho was built in 1910.  It was listed on the National Register of Historic Places in 1982.

It is a -story brick-and-frame house with a front-facing gable.  The brick is buff-colored.

It was deemed significant "as one of Paris' handsomest and most substantial bungalows. It is one of the relatively few in brick; it projects the characteristic features of the bungalow type while retaining a curiously Queen Anne quality in its  combination of textures and imaginative fenestration. The use of narrow ceiling and larger strips on the very large gable like that on the similar Fred Price bungalow (site #67) is a bold example of a device pecularily popular in bungalows. The lattice-like gable apron, and the beveled bay, are unique elements."

References

Houses on the National Register of Historic Places in Idaho
Houses completed in 1910
Bear Lake County, Idaho
American Craftsman architecture in Idaho
Bungalow architecture in Idaho